Lara is an unincorporated community in Northumberland and Richmond counties, in the U.S. state of Virginia.

References

Unincorporated communities in Virginia
Unincorporated communities in Northumberland County, Virginia
Unincorporated communities in Richmond County, Virginia